This is a listing of live-action motion picture shorts produced by Walt Disney or The Walt Disney Company, from 1922 to present. This list only includes shorts which were initially released as individual shorts, which excludes the shorts that were originally released as part of Disney features in the 1950s and later re-released as individual shorts. This list also does not include shorts that do not contain any original stock footage. This list includes shorts with both live action and animation only if the majority of the short contains live action. This list does not include any trailers as they are usually edited from the features they are supposed to promote.

Theatrical

1920s

Note: Some of the Alice Comedies shorts were primarily live-action but for consistency's sake they are included on the list of Disney animated shorts.

1940s

1950s

1960s

1970s

1980s

Non-theatrical

Coordinator of Inter-American Affairs films

Music Videos

Online films

Theme park films

Educational films 

The following films were produced by Disney Educational to be shown in schools.

1970s

1970s

1980s

1990s

2000s

See also
True-Life Adventures
People & Places
Circle-Vision 360°
Welcome to Pooh Corner
Questions! / Answers?
Bill Nye the Science Guy
 Disney Channel
 List of Disney animated shorts
 List of Disney theatrical animated features
 List of Disney feature films
 List of Disney home entertainment
 List of Disney television series

Notes

References
 Disney listes France
 Disney film guide
 Disney educational official
 Catalogy

Live action shorts

Lists of short films